Years is a 1993 box set by Elvis Costello. The Rykodisc (US) and Demon Records (UK and Europe) Costello reissues (1993–1995) would ultimately include his eleven studio albums (each with bonus tracks) released from 1977 to 1991 on Columbia (in the US) and Stiff Records, Radar Records, F-Beat Records and Demon Records (for the rest of the world) plus a reissue of the G.B.H. soundtrack, the Live at the El Mocambo album and The Very Best of Elvis Costello and The Attractions 1977-86, a greatest hits collection.

In 2001, Rhino Records would launch another Costello reissue program, taking a different approach than Rykodisc and Demon (see Elvis Costello main page). In 2007, Costello's 1977–86 catalogue was re-released by Hip-O Records, the reissue division of Costello's then current label, Universal Music.

 Years contained the first three albums (expanded) plus an official release of the often bootlegged Live at the El Mocambo.

Track listing
All songs written by Elvis Costello unless otherwise indicated.

Disc one (My Aim Is True)
 "Welcome to the Working Week" – 1:22
 "Miracle Man" – 3:31
 "No Dancing" – 2:39
 "Blame It on Cain" – 2:49
 "Alison" – 3:21
 "Sneaky Feelings" – 2:09
 "(The Angels Wanna Wear My) Red Shoes" – 2:47
 "Less Than Zero" – 3:15
 "Mystery Dance" – 1:38
 "Pay It Back" – 2:33
 "I'm Not Angry" – 2:57
 "Waiting for the End of the World" – 3:22
 "Watching the Detectives" – 3:45
 "Radio Sweetheart" – 2:25
 "Stranger in the House" – 3:01
 "Imagination Is a Powerful Deceiver" – 3:38
 "Mystery Dance" – 2:13
 "Cheap Reward" – 2:15
 "Jump Up" – 2:06
 "Wave a White Flag" – 1:53
 "Blame It on Cain" – 3:30
 "Poison Moon" – 1:53

Disc two (This Year's Model)
 "No Action" – 1:58
 "This Year's Girl" – 3:17
 "The Beat" – 3:45
 "Pump It Up" – 3:14
 "Little Triggers" – 2:40
 "You Belong to Me" – 2:22
 "Hand in Hand" – 2:33
 "(I Don't Want to Go to) Chelsea" – 3:07
 "Lip Service" – 2:36
 "Living in Paradise" – 3:52
 "Lipstick Vogue" – 3:29
 "Night Rally" – 2:41
 "Radio, Radio" – 3:05
 "Big Tears" – 3:09
 "Crawling to the USA" – 2:53
 "Running Out of Angels" – 2:02
 "Green Shirt" – 2:20
 "Big Boys" – 3:00

Disc three (Armed Forces)
 "Accidents Will Happen" – 3:00
 "Senior Service" – 2:17
 "Oliver's Army" – 2:58
 "Big Boys" – 2:54
 "Green Shirt" – 2:42
 "Party Girl" – 3:20
 "Goon Squad" – 3:14
 "Busy Bodies" – 3:33
 "Sunday's Best" – 3:22
 "Moods for Moderns" – 2:48
 "Chemistry Class" – 2:55
 "Two Little Hitlers" – 3:10
 "(What's So Funny 'Bout) Peace, Love and Understanding?" (Nick Lowe) – 3:31
 "My Funny Valentine" (Richard Rodgers, Lorenz Hart) – 1:28
 "Tiny Steps" – 2:42
 "Clean Money" – 1:57
 "Talking in the Dark" – 1:56
 "Wednesday Week" – 2:01
 "Accidents Will Happen" (Live) – 3:06
 "Alison" (Live) – 3:06
 "Watching the Detectives" (Live) – 6:08

Disc four (Live at the El Mocambo)
 "Mystery Dance" (Live) – 2:19
 "Waiting for the End of the World" (Live) – 3:52
 "Welcome to the Working Week" (Live) – 1:19
 "Less Than Zero" (Live) – 4:08
 "The Beat" (Live) – 3:33
 "Lip Service" (Live) – 2:26
 "(I Don't Want to Go to) Chelsea " (Live) – 3:56
 "Little Triggers" (Live) – 2:47
 "Radio, Radio" (Live) – 2:33
 "Lipstick Vogue" (Live) – 4:46
 "Watching the Detectives" (Live) – 5:48
 "Miracle Man/Band Introduction" (Live) – 4:07
 "You Belong to Me" (Live) – 2:32
 "Pump It Up" (Live) – 4:42

References

Albums produced by Elvis Costello
Albums produced by Nick Lowe
Elvis Costello compilation albums
1993 compilation albums
Rykodisc compilation albums
Demon Music Group compilation albums